Spanish Creek may refer to:

Spanish Creek (British Columbia)
Spanish Creek (Plumas County, California)
Spanish Creek (Georgia)